RattanIndia, formerly RattanIndia Infrastructure Ltd, is an Indian company that is involved in the energy sector. The traditional focus of the company was on coal on thermal power, however more recently the company has expanded its scope, focusing more on emerging technologies and e-commerce.

The company supplies electricity to Maharashtra state and uses coal from  South Coalfields Limited and Mahanadi Coalfields Limited.Rattan India has two thermal power plants: the first is the Nashik power plant that was reported stranded in 2020 due to no long-term purchase agreements and conflicts on land acquisition. The other power plant is in Amravati that was commissioned in 2015. Amravati power plant was in debt and Goldman Sachs Varde partners took over the Rs 4050 crores against 15 percent equity in 2019.The company was also involved in solar energy but that component was sold to GIP for Rs 1067 crore in September 2020 and the company exited the solar business.  Rattan India was the outcome of the split of Indiabulls where the energy component was named as RattanIndia in 2014. The company is listed on National Stock Exchange and Bombay Stock Exchange. Brickwork Ratings provided the rating for the Bank Loan Facilities of aggregating to Rs.7617.99 Crs in October 2020.

Acquisition of Revolt Motors 

In October 2022, RattanIndia Enterprises Ltd announced that they would be acquiring the electric motorcycle company Revolt Motors for an undisclosed figure.  The takeover was completed in January 2023.

Allegations of irregularity 
There have been allegation on irregularities on RattanIndia by Lone Star Funds with which the company had formed a finance company.

References

1999 establishments in Haryana
Companies based in New Delhi
Companies listed on the National Stock Exchange of India
Conglomerate companies established in 1999
Companies listed on the Bombay Stock Exchange
Electric power companies of India
Energy companies established in 1999